Smaranda Olarinde is a Nigerian professor of Law, President of the Nigerian Association of Law Teachers and incumbent Vice chancellor of Afe Babalola University.
In 1995, she served as UNICEF's legal researcher for Niger and Oyo State.

Career
Mrs. Olarinde has over three decades of cumulative experience as a law teacher, academic, researcher and legal practitioner. Her legal background, in both civil law (Romania) and common law (Nigeria) systems, adds to her diverse multidisciplinary profile.

Her focus has been on women, children and young adolescents rights and protection. In 1989, she was a legal researcher for IDRC on land tenure and access to land for women. She also served as a legal researcher for the World Bank on law development and the status of women (1990) and towards a gender strategy in Nigeria (1992).

She was a member of the “think tank” for the legal protection of children in Oyo State and coordinator of the International Federation of Women Lawyers (FIDA).

Mrs. Olarinde carried out several multidisciplinary researches on reproductive rights, women and children's rights, HIV/AIDS and participated in the collaborative effort between researchers from Israel, the Netherlands and Nigeria.

She is actively involved in training law students at the undergraduate and postgraduate levels, as well as law clinicians for participation in community services involving pro bono legal advice.

Personal life 
Smaranda is the mother of Freeze of Cool FM personality Ifedayo Olarinde.

See also
Afe Babalola

References

External links

Living people
People from Oyo State
Nigerian women lawyers
Nigerian human rights activists
Nigerian women academics
Academic staff of the University of Ibadan
Nigerian people of Romanian descent
Nigerian women activists
UNICEF people
Nigerian officials of the United Nations
Year of birth missing (living people)
Yoruba people